The State Register of Heritage Places is maintained by the Heritage Council of Western Australia. , 122 places are heritage-listed in the City of Karratha, of which 30 are on the State Register of Heritage Places.

List
The Western Australian State Register of Heritage Places, lists the following 30 state registered places within the City of Karratha:

References

Karratha
 
Karratha